Zheleznodorozhny (Timer yul) is a rural locality (a selo) and the administrative centre of Zheleznodorozhny Selsoviet, Beloretsky District, Bashkortostan, Russia. The population was 3,020 as of 2010. There are 41 streets.

Geography 
Zheleznodorozhny is located 10 km southwest of Beloretsk (the district's administrative centre) by road. Lomovka is the nearest rural locality.

References 

Rural localities in Beloretsky District